Nedumangad is a town and municipality in India that serves as headquarters of Nedumangad tehsil. Nedumangad may also refer to
Nedumangad (State Assembly constituency) in India
Nedumangad Sivanandan (born 1935), Indian carnatic violinist
Anil Nedumangad (1972–2020), Indian film actor